Earl Cenac (born 30 September 1947) is a Saint Lucian cricketer. He played in three first-class matches for the Windward Islands from 1974 to 1982.

See also
 List of Windward Islands first-class cricketers

References

External links
 

1947 births
Living people
Saint Lucian cricketers
Windward Islands cricketers